The 2016–17 season was UD Las Palmas 49th season in existence . It covered a period from 1 July 2016 to 30 June 2017.

Squad

Transfers

In

Summer

Loan in

Winter

Statistics

Squad statistics

Goalscorers

Clean sheets

Competitions

Overview

League table

La Liga

Matches

Copa del Rey

Round of 32

Round of 16

Out on loan

Player transfers

Awards

Manager

References

External links
Club's official website

UD Las Palmas
UD Las Palmas seasons